Mark Sean O'Hare (born July 18, 1968) is an American cartoonist, animator, writer and storyboard artist who created the comic strip Citizen Dog.

O'Hare is well known for his work on animated television shows as a writer and storyboard artist for Rocko's Modern Life, SpongeBob SquarePants, Dexter's Laboratory, The Powerpuff Girls, Hey Arnold!, The Angry Beavers, The Mighty B! and Chowder. He also performed storyboard work on The Ren and Stimpy Show. Throughout the run of the series, O'Hare served as the creative director and supervising producer on Camp Lazlo. He is currently a storyboard artist at Illumination Entertainment.

Although accepted into the aeronautical engineering program at Purdue University, O'Hare shifted focus after his sophomore year to study graphic design, later getting acceptance into the character animation program at California Institute of the Arts.

While a student at Purdue University, he drew a strip called Art Gallery for the student newspaper, The Exponent. The comic ran from the autumn of 1987 to the spring of 1990.

O'Hare has been nominated four times for an Emmy from the Academy of Television Arts & Sciences and won his first Emmy in 2007 for "Outstanding Animated Program" on Camp Lazlo and his second in 2008.

He is good friends with fellow director Tim Hill.

Filmography

Television

Film

References

http://thejournalix.com/citizen-dog/

External links
 
 http://www.gocomics.com/citizendog/

1968 births
American cartoonists
California Institute of the Arts alumni
Purdue University alumni
Living people
American animators
American animated film directors
American animated film producers
American storyboard artists
American television directors
American television producers
American television writers
American male screenwriters
American male television writers
DreamWorks Animation people
Illumination (company) people
Primetime Emmy Award winners